The 2003 Girls' Youth European Volleyball Championship was the 5th edition of the competition, with the main phase (contested between 8 teams) held in Croatia from 22 to 27 April 2003.

Qualification

Venues

Preliminary round

Pool I

|}

|}

Pool II

|}

|}

5th–8th classification

5th–8th semifinals

|}

7th place match

|}

5th place match

|}

Final round

Semifinals

|}

3rd place match

|}

Final

|}

Final standing

Awards
Most Valuable Player
  Senna Ušić
Best Attacker
  Veronica Angeloni 
Best Server
  Mirjana Đurić 
Best Blocker
  Ilaria Garzaro 
Best Setter
  Diana Reščić 
Best Libero
  Ekaterina Kabeshova 
Best Receiver
  Senna Ušić

References

Girls' Youth European Volleyball Championship
Europe
Volley
International volleyball competitions hosted by Croatia